Ornella Micheli (sometimes credited as Donna Christie or Ornella Micheli Donati) was an Italian film editor active from the 1950s through the 1980s. She often worked on the exploitation films and thrillers of directors Lucio Fulci, Riccardo Freda, and Giuliano Carnimeo.

Biography 
She was the daughter of Roberto Rosselini's key grips, and she apprenticed under Rosselini's editor, Jolanda Benvenuti. Her brother, Bruno Micheli, also worked as a film editor.

Selected filmography 

 Porno Holocaust (1981)
 Erotic Nights of the Living Dead (1980)
 Antropophagus (1980)
 Sesso nero (1980)
 Beyond the Darkness (1979)
 Silver Saddle (1978)
 The Psychic (1977)
 My Sister in Law (1976)
 Piange... il telefono (1975)
 Dracula in the Provinces (1975)
 Challenge to White Fang (1974)
 White Fang (1973)
 Holy God, Here Comes the Passatore! (1973)
 Don't Torture a Duckling (1972)
 Return of Halleluja (1972)
 His Name Was Holy Ghost (1972)
 They Call Him Cemetery (1971)
 Guns for Dollars (1971)
 Light the Fuse... Sartana Is Coming (1970)
 Sartana's Here... Trade Your Pistol for a Coffin (1970)
 I Am Sartana, Your Angel of Death (1969)
 One on Top of the Other (1969)
 Suicide Commandos (1968)
 Find a Place to Die (1968)
 The Moment to Kill (1968)
 Operazione San Pietro (1967)
 Bang Bang Kid (1967)
 How to Kill 400 Duponts (1967)
 The Hills Run Red (1966)
 The Brute and the Beast (1966)
 The Third Eye (1966)
 The Wacky World of James Tont (1966)
 Goldsinger (1965)
 How We Got into Trouble with the Army (1965)
 Samson in King Solomon's Mines (1964)
 The Avenger of Venice (1964)
 Il magnifico avventuriero (1963)
 The Horrible Dr. Hichcock (1962)
 Marco Polo (1962)
 The Witch's Curse (1962)
 Samson and the 7 Miracles of the World (1961)
 The Lion of Amalfi (1950)

References 

Italian film editors
Italian women film editors